Avot may refer to:
 Pirkei Avot, a tractate of the Mishna composed of ethical maxims of the Rabbis of the Mishnaic period
 Patriarchs (Bible), Abraham, Isaac, and Jacob
 Avot, Côte-d'Or, a commune in France
 Neve Avot, a hospital in Israel

See also
 Magen Avot (disambiguation)